Lee So-yeon (Hangul: 이소연; born 16 April 1993 in Suwon) is a South Korean short track speed skater. She won a bronze medal in a 1000 m event at the  2012–13 ISU Short Track Speed Skating World Cup.

References

1993 births
Living people
Four Continents Short Track Speed Skating Championships medalists
South Korean female short track speed skaters
People from Suwon
Sportspeople from Gyeonggi Province
21st-century South Korean women
Universiade medalists in short track speed skating
Universiade gold medalists for South Korea
Competitors at the 2013 Winter Universiade